The 1981 LSU Tigers football team represented Louisiana State University (LSU) during the 1981 NCAA Division I-A football season.

In its second season under Jerry Stovall, LSU went 3-7-1, its worst record since going 3–7 in Paul Dietzel's second season of 1956. This mark for futility has been surpassed twice, 2–9 in 1992 and 3–8 in 1999.

The Tigers' second game, a 27–9 loss at Notre Dame, was Gerry Faust's inaugural outing as Fighting Irish coach. LSU returned to South Bend four years later and defeated Notre Dame 10–7 in what turned out to be Faust's last game at Notre Dame Stadium.

LSU's 48–7 loss to in-state rival Tulane was its second largest margin of defeat in the series, eclipsed only by a 46–0 shutout at home in 1948.

Schedule

Roster

References

LSU
LSU Tigers football seasons
LSU Tigers football